Keren Meloul better known as Rose (born in Nice on May 24, 1978) is a French singer, songwriter, author and composer.

After studying law, she became a school teacher teaching at the Jewish Merkaz Ohr Joseph in the 19e arrondissement of Paris before launching into music. She gained fame in 2006 with the single "La Liste" followed by a similarly titled album. She got a great boost when French singer Alain Souchon invited her to open for him at l'Olympia de Paris and at Zénith de Paris in 2006. In 2007 she started her own tour and appeared at La Cigale, a second time at l'Olympia as first part of her husband Bensé's concert and in Montreal in 2008.

In 2009, she recorded her second album Les Souvenirs sous ma frange produced by Jérôme Plasseraud and Thibaut Barbillon, both members of the group 1973. In 2013 she followed that up with a third album Et puis juin.

In addition, she has written songs for other artists, notably for Jenifer, appeared in a charity single for Les voix de l'enfant, project of La Fondation Abbé Pierre and in Sidaction in a duet with Alain Souchon. She also took part in album We Love Disney with the song "Au bout du rêve".

Personal life
Her maternal grandfather immigrated from Italy to France. Her mother was an interior designer and her father a pied noir and a real estate agent.

Rose married singer songwriter Bensé (real name Julien Bensenior) in a civil court on 24 June 2008 followed by a religious marriage on 24 August 2008 in Var. But the couple divorced in November 2009. On 8 June 2011, Rose had a baby boy she named Solal.

Discography

Albums

Singles

References

External links
Official website

1978 births
Living people
21st-century French singers
21st-century French women singers